Rogério Zimmermann (born 10 June 1965) is a Brazilian football coach and former player who played as a right back. He is the current head coach of Brasil de Pelotas.

Biography
Zimmermann started his manager career at Brasil de Pelotas in 2004.
He worked in the clubs Rio Grande do Sul as Canoas Sport Club, Futebol Clube Santa Cruz, Pelotas and Pernambuco club Cabense.

Since 2012, he has been the coach of Brasil de Pelotas, for the second time.

In October 2015, his club, Brasil de Pelotas, drew 0-0 with Fortaleza Esporte Clube, after winning 1-0 in the first match, and was promoted to Campeonato Brasileiro Série B in 2016.

Honours 
Brasil de Pelotas
 Campeonato Gaúcho Série B:  2013

References

1965 births
Living people
Footballers from Porto Alegre
Brazilian football managers
Campeonato Brasileiro Série B managers
Campeonato Brasileiro Série C managers
Campeonato Brasileiro Série D managers
Grêmio Esportivo Brasil managers
Futebol Clube Santa Cruz managers
Esporte Clube Pelotas managers
Joinville Esporte Clube managers
Botafogo Futebol Clube (PB) managers
Clube Esportivo Bento Gonçalves managers
Sociedade Esportiva e Recreativa Caxias do Sul managers